Aprosopus is a genus of beetles in the family Cerambycidae, first described by Alcide d'Orbigny in 1842.

Species 
Aprosopus contains the following species:

 Aprosopus barbatulus (Martins & Galileo, 2013)
 Aprosopus buqueti d'Orbigny, 1842

References

Agapanthiini